Homelix morini is a species of beetle in the family Cerambycidae. It was described by Pierre Téocchi in 1999. It is known from Cameroon, the Democratic Republic of the Congo, and the Central African Republic.

References

Phrynetini
Beetles described in 1999